Tao Runai (1601 - 1683), courtesy name Zhongtiao and Xieyou, art name Mi'an and Shixinong, dharma name Rentoutuo, was a Chinese official, scholar, calligrapher and Buddhist monk who resisted the Qing conquest of China in the 17th century. He spent most of his life during the Manchu conquest of China and anti-Qing activities after the Ming dynasty had been overthrown.

Biography
Tao was born in Huangminglou Town of Ningxiang, Hunan in 1601. In 1629 he entered Guozijian, the highest institution of traditional Chinese culture in China. After graduation, he became an official in south China's Guangdong province. In 1644, after the Ming dynasty (1368–1644) had been overthrown, Zhu Yousong built his capital at Nanjing and named his new regime "Hongguang", Tao went to join the Southern Ming dynasty (1644–1645). But the new country has only one year to exist, Tao had to go to Guangxi and served as an official in the Yongli Regime (1646–1661). After the collapse of Yongli Regime, he received ordination as a monk in Miyin Temple, Weishan Township. He had a dharma name "Rentoutuo" (means a patient monk).

Work

References

1601 births
1683 deaths
People from Ningxiang
Writers from Changsha
Qing dynasty Buddhist monks
Chinese Confucianists
Ming dynasty scholars
Qing dynasty scholars
Qing dynasty writers
Ming dynasty writers
Ming dynasty calligraphers
Qing dynasty calligraphers